Gail Gibbons is an American writer and illustrator of children's books, most of which are non-fiction. She started her career as a graphic artist for television, but transitioned to writing and designing children's books in the 1970s.

Early life 
Gibbons was born in Oak Park, Illinois in 1944, and she was described as exhibiting "artistic talents at an early age." She gained a reputation in school as an artist, eventually creating her own small books that she personally described as "writing and drawing pictures of what I loved and where I wanted to be." She often visited the Chicago Art Institute nearby which likely fueled her passion for art. She studied graphic design at the University of Illinois. Gibbons herself quoted in the Something about the Author Autobiography Series, "I consider myself quite fortunate because I never had to debate with myself as to what I wanted to do with my life. The answer was always there. I wanted to be a writer and artist." Gibbons was inspired by one of her professors at the University of Illinois who was a professional children's book illustrator.

When she was 21, she married Glenn Gibbons, and started her first job with a television station in Champaign, Illinois. She worked on children's show designing on-air graphics and set design. Later, the couple moved to Chicago, and Gibbons continued her work with the TV station, WMAQ-TV while also picking up jobs in advertising. In 1969, she moved to New York City, worked for WNBC-TV, and ended up designing a few graphics for Saturday Night Live. In 1971, she became the graphic designer for Take a Giant Step, a children's television program on NBC.

Career 
Gail Gibbons first book was Willy and His Wheel Wagon, a 32-page self-illustrated picture book published by Prentice-Hall. By 1978, Gibbons had published 5 children's books, including Things to Make and Do for Halloween and Salvador and Mister Sam: A Guide to Parakeet Care. By 1979, Gibbons was pushed to publish solely non-fiction children's books, and she released Clocks and How They Go, which exhibits a more direct teaching style in writing. Gibbons continued with this style of writing, growing into a prolific non-fiction children's book author and illustrator. Some of her books were even chosen as Reading Rainbow selections. Her most recent book was Planes, published in January 2019.

Awards
Source:
City Art Director Club award, 1979, for The Missing Maple Syrup Sap Mystery 
 American Institute of Graphic Arts award, 1979, for Clocks and How They Go 
 National Science Teachers Association/Children's Book Council Award, 1980, for Locks and Keys, and 1982, for Tool Book 
 Certificate of appreciation from U.S. Postmaster General, 1982, for The Post Office Book: Mail and How It Moves
 American Library Association Notable Book citation, 1983, for Cars and How They Go, and 1985, for The Milk Makers 
 Washington Post/ Children's Book Guild Award, 1987, for contribution to nonfiction children's literature
 National Council of Social Studies Notable Children's Trade Book in the Field of Social Studies, 1983, 1987, 1989, 1990, and 1992
 National Science Teachers Association Outstanding Science Trade Books for Children, 1983, 1987, 1991, 1998 
 International Reading Association Children's Choice Award, 1989, 1995; American Bookseller Pick of the Lists, 1992

Selected works

 Willy and His Wheel Wagon (Prentice-Hall, 1975), self-illustrated
 Salvador and Mister Sam: A Guide to Parakeet Care (P-H, 1975), self-illustrated
 Behold ... the Dragons
 Behold ... the Unicorns!
 Farming
 Fire! Fire!
 Giant Pandas
 How a House Is Built
 Knights in Shining Armor
 My Basketball Book
 Penguins
 Pigs
 The Seasons of Arnold's Apple Tree (1984)
 Tell Me, Tree: A Book About Trees for Kids
 The Milk Makers
 The Vegetables We Eat
 The Reasons for Seasons
 
 Emergency!
 Catch the Wind!: All About Kites
 Sunken Treasure
 Department Store 
 Zoo
 Beacons of Light: Lighthouses
 Flying
 Up Goes the Skyscraper
 Country Fair
 Click!: A book about cameras and taking pictures 
 How a house is built Paper, Paper Everywhere 
 Exploring the deep, dark sea 
 Deadline!: From News to Newspaper 
 My Football Book
 The Post Office Book: Mail and How it Moves
 Fill It Up!
 Weather Forecasting
 Pottery Place		 
 Playgrounds
 My Basketball Book
 Trains
 The Reasons for Seasons
 Caves and Caverns
 Locks and Keys
 The Milk Makers
 The Honey Makers
 Tunnels
 Yippee-Yay!: A Book About Cowboys and Cowgirls
 Sun Up, Sun Down
 My Soccer Book

References

External links

 
 Video interview with transcript, short biography, and more at Reading Rockets
 

1944 births
Living people
American children's writers
Children's non-fiction writers
American women children's writers
University of Illinois alumni
21st-century American women